Gudrun Theuerkauff, née Vorbrich (born 8 April 1937) is a German fencer. She won a bronze medal in the women's team foil event at the 1964 Summer Olympics.

References

1937 births
Living people
German female fencers
Olympic fencers of the United Team of Germany
Olympic fencers of West Germany
Fencers at the 1960 Summer Olympics
Fencers at the 1964 Summer Olympics
Fencers at the 1968 Summer Olympics
Fencers at the 1972 Summer Olympics
Olympic bronze medalists for the United Team of Germany
Olympic medalists in fencing
Sportspeople from Szczecin
Medalists at the 1964 Summer Olympics
Universiade medalists in fencing
Universiade silver medalists for West Germany
Medalists at the 1959 Summer Universiade